Henri Meiss (born 12 November 1963) is a French wrestler. He competed in the men's Greco-Roman 90 kg at the 1992 Summer Olympics.

References

1963 births
Living people
French male sport wrestlers
Olympic wrestlers of France
Wrestlers at the 1992 Summer Olympics
Sportspeople from Abidjan
20th-century French people